Julio César Rodríguez Giménez (born 5 December 1990) is a Paraguayan professional footballer who plays as a centre-forward.

Career
Rodríguez's first taste of senior football came in October 2010 as he was selected on the bench by Defensa y Justicia for a match against Tiro Federal in Primera B Nacional, he didn't make an appearance for the club until after his loan move to Primera C Metropolitana side Berazategui. He scored three goals in twenty-five games for Berazategui before making his Defensa y Justicia debut on 13 October 2012 in a defeat to Instituto. He went onto make twenty-four league appearances in 2012–13 for Defensa y Justicia before leaving the club and Argentine football to join Ascenso MX side Dorados de Sinaloa in 2013.

Two goals in sixteen appearances followed, during which time Rodríguez spent time with Dorados' senior affiliate Liga MX team Tijuana on loan. He made just one appearance for Tijuana in a 6–0 home win over Honduran side Victoria in the 2013–14 CONCACAF Champions League. In 2014, he completed a loan move to Argentine Primera División side Godoy Cruz. Sixteen games and three goals followed for him at Godoy. After his time in Mendoza, Rodríguez rejoined Defensa y Justicia on loan and subsequently scored six times in thirty-two matches in two seasons in Argentina's top tier for them.

2016 saw Rodríguez make temporary moves to Unión Santa Fe and Arsenal de Sarandí. A year later, in August 2017, Rodríguez joined Primera B Nacional side Almagro. However, he soon returned to Dorados after contractual disagreements. In January 2018, Rodríguez signed for Paraguayan Primera División team Deportivo Capiatá. He scored on his debut for the club, netting the opening goal in a win over Deportivo Santaní on 25 February. He departed the end of 2018, scoring four times across twenty-five fixtures. In January 2019, Rodríguez went to Azerbaijan to sign with top-flight Zira.

Following nine goals in fourteen games in his first seven months, Rodríguez renewed his contract with Zira on 20 June 2019. On 29 January 2020, Rodríguez signed a contract with fellow Azerbaijani team Sabah on a season-long deal. His first appearance for Sabah came on 1 February against former club Zira. In the succeeding September, Rodríguez scored his first goal for Sabah - again, against Zira.

Career statistics
.

References

External links
 

1990 births
Living people
Sportspeople from Asunción
Paraguayan footballers
Paraguayan expatriate footballers
Expatriate footballers in Argentina
Expatriate footballers in Mexico
Expatriate footballers in Azerbaijan
Paraguayan expatriate sportspeople in Argentina
Paraguayan expatriate sportspeople in Mexico
Paraguayan expatriate sportspeople in Azerbaijan
Association football forwards
Primera Nacional players
Liga MX players
Argentine Primera División players
Paraguayan Primera División players
Azerbaijan Premier League players
Defensa y Justicia footballers
A.D. Berazategui footballers
Dorados de Sinaloa footballers
Club Tijuana footballers
Godoy Cruz Antonio Tomba footballers
Unión de Santa Fe footballers
Arsenal de Sarandí footballers
Club Almagro players
Deportivo Capiatá players
Zira FK players
Sabah FC (Azerbaijan) players